Hassan Rajab Khatib (born January 1, 1946) is a Member of Parliament in the National Assembly of Tanzania.

References
Parliament of Tanzania

Members of the National Assembly (Tanzania)
Living people
1946 births
Place of birth missing (living people)
21st-century Tanzanian politicians